Hadden Irving Clark (born July 31, 1952) is an American veteran, murderer and serial killer, currently serving two 30-year sentences at Eastern Correctional Institution in Westover, Maryland for the murders of 6-year-old Michelle Dorr in 1986, and 23-year-old Laura Houghteling in 1992. He was also given a 10-year sentence for robbery after stealing from a former landlord.

Family life
Clark is the second of four children, and was born and raised in Troy, New York. His brother, Bradfield Clark, strangled a woman in California before eating several body parts.

Clark's parents were both alcoholics and often fought with each other in front of their children. Clark's mother dressed him in girls' clothes when drunk. His father eventually committed suicide. As a teenager, Clark tortured and killed animals owned by children who bullied him.

Clark trained as a chef and served in the United States Navy until he was discharged after being diagnosed with paranoid schizophrenia. Over the years, he held a number of menial jobs but was mostly homeless. Clark was arrested multiple times for theft and retaliation. He was arrested for robbery after he vandalized a former landlord's property and committed several thefts.

Murders
On May 31, 1986, Clark was ordered by his brother to move out of the latter's home in Silver Spring, Maryland. Michelle Dorr, a six-year-old friend of his niece, came over looking for her. Clark took her up to an upstairs room and stabbed Michelle to death. Clark then drank some of her blood and stuffed her in a duffel bag. He buried her in a park 12 miles away.

On October 18, 1992, he killed 23-year-old Laura Houghteling in Bethesda, Maryland. Clark was working as a gardener for Laura's mother Penny when she accused Hadden of stealing tools from her backyard shed. Clark entered the house through the back door and stabbed Laura to death in her bedroom with a kitchen knife and suffocated her with a pillow. He carried her body in a bedsheet through a wooded area and buried her a half-mile away. He left behind a pillow with his fingerprint as he moved the body. He later returned and dressed up in a wig and women's clothes and left through the front door to make people think Laura left the house alive to buy time to clean the scene. Police soon discovered the bloody pillow and linked the print on it to Clark. Clark confessed and led police to Laura's body eight months after the murder. Police began looking at him for Michelle Dorr's murder after discovering he lived two houses down from Michelle's father at the time she disappeared. Police later tested his brother's old house for blood and found Michelle's blood in the wooden floorboards of an upstairs bedroom. Clark later led police to her body in January 2000.

Alleged murders
Clark has confessed to murdering dozens of people starting as a teenager. In 2004, he sent a letter claiming he had killed an unidentified woman in Cape Cod, Massachusetts in 1974 known as "Lady of the Dunes". Clark explained that he had buried evidence from the crime in his grandfather's garden and that he knew the woman's identity but was not going to tell authorities because he claimed they mistreated him. As he has paranoid schizophrenia, police doubt the accuracy of the confession. He led police on December 15, 2000, to his grandparents' former property where they discovered a plastic bucket with more than 200 pieces of jewelry. Among the items were Laura Houghteling's high school class ring. Clark claimed they were "trophies" he took from his victims.

Media

Books
 Author Adrian Havill's book Born Evil: A True Story of Cannibalism and Sexual Murder (2001) is a true crime story of Hadden Clark's crimes.
 Author Robert Keller's book True Crime: American Monsters Volume 3: 12 Horrific American Serial Killers (2013) one of the 12 murderers reported on in the book is Hadden Clark. The author focuses on Clark's cross-dressing cannibalism and his stash of mementos suggesting there are more victims.

Television
 The Channel 5 (UK) series Born to Kill episode  aired: 17 September 2013, reports on Clark's formative years and their impact on his adult criminal behavior.
 The Investigation Discovery network series Evil, I season 5 episode 32, "Dressed to Kill", aired August 3, 2012, reports on Houghteling's disappearance and law enforcement suspects the family gardener Clark is responsible. When police search his storage shed they discover evidence tying him to her death.
 Court TV released multiple crime-documentary episodes from different shows covering the Hadden Clark crimes.
 Forensic Files - Season 7, Episode 25: "Dressed to Kill", aired March 29, 2003, covers Michelle Lee Dorr's case. Her dad is mentally traumatized by his daughter's passing and provides detectives with a false confession. However further investigation uncovers evidence leading to the real killer.
 The series Mugshots episode "Portrait of a Serial Killer: Hadden Clark", aired June 1, 2002.
 The true crime and on-the-scene police investigation series Crime Stories episode "Dark Secrets: Hadden Clark", aired: 2002.
 The series The Investigators episode "Dark Secrets", aired: 9 September 2002.
 Forensic Files - Season 3, Episode 9: "Beaten by a Hair", aired: November 26, 1998, covers Laura Houghteling's disappearance. Police find the victim's hair brush with 30 hairs, one of which was artificial and did not belong to Laura. The artificial hair, along with other forensic evidence, directly tied Clark to her death.

Podcasts
 Two-part series on The Last Podcast on the Left episodes "Hadden Clark Part I- Mommy's Basement Bakery" and "Hadden Clark Part II- Women's Panties", aired: November 2019.

See also
 List of serial killers in the United States

References

External links
 Hadden Clark Profile of Clark. It cites inter alia the Crime Library article cited above, an article at mayhem.net, and Born Evil as sources.
 TruTV Crime Library: Hadden Clark
 Prime Suspects: The Michelle Dorr Story (5 chapters, August 1997), washingtonpost.com; accessed July 26, 2020.

1952 births
American cannibals
American murderers of children
American people convicted of murder
Living people
People convicted of murder by Maryland
People from Troy, New York
People with schizophrenia
Suspected serial killers